ACT-539313 is an orexin antagonist medication which is under development for the treatment of binge eating disorder and was previously under development for the treatment of anxiety disorders. It is an orally active small-molecule compound with an elimination half-life of 3.3 to 6.5hours and acts as a selective orexin OX1 receptor antagonist (1-SORA). As of May 2022, the drug is in phase 2 clinical trials for binge eating disorder. Following negative efficacy results of a phase 2 trial of ACT-539313 for binge eating disorder, Idorsia (the developer of ACT-539313) signaled in May 2022 that it would not pursue further development of the drug for this indication.

References 

Experimental drugs
Ketones
Morpholines
Orexin antagonists
Triazoles